Juan Flere Pizzuti (born 12 May 1998) is an Argentine footballer who plays as a goalkeeper for Spanish club Algeciras CF, on loan from Cádiz CF.

Club career
Born in Bariloche, Flere moved to Catalonia at early age and finished his formation with CF Damm. On 14 June 2017, he signed for UE Llagostera, being initially assigned to the reserves in the regional leagues.

Flere made his senior debut on 3 September 2017, starting in a 2–1 home win against CE Banyoles. In October 2018, he left the club and joined Tercera División side Xerez Deportivo FC on a one-year deal. At the latter club he was a regular starter, and set a club record of 1,003 minutes without conceding.

On 2 July 2019, Flere moved to Cádiz CF, being initially assigned to the B-team in Segunda División B. He made his first-team debut on 20 July of the following year, starting in a 0–1 home loss against Albacete Balompié in the Segunda División.

On 9 December 2021, Flere renewed his contract until 2025. The following 7 July, he was loaned to Primera División RFEF side Algeciras CF for the season.

References

External links

1998 births
Living people
Sportspeople from Bariloche
Argentine footballers
Association football goalkeepers
Segunda División players
Segunda División B players
Segunda Federación players
Tercera División players
Divisiones Regionales de Fútbol players
CF Damm players
Xerez Deportivo FC footballers
Cádiz CF B players
Cádiz CF players
Algeciras CF footballers
Argentine expatriate footballers
Argentine expatriate sportspeople in Spain
Expatriate footballers in Spain